WDSV (91.9 FM) is a radio station licensed to serve the community of Greenville, Mississippi. The station is owned by Delta Foundation, Inc., and airs a community radio format.

The station was assigned the WDSV call letters by the Federal Communications Commission on December 22, 2008.

References

External links
 Official Website
 FCC Public Inspection File for WDSV
 

DSV
Radio stations established in 2011
2011 establishments in Mississippi
Community radio stations in the United States
Washington County, Mississippi